An internal node of a phylogenetic tree is described as a polytomy    or multifurcation if (i) it is in a rooted tree and is linked to three or more child subtrees or (ii) it is in an unrooted tree and is attached to four or more branches. A tree that contains any multifurcations can be described as a multifurcating tree.

Soft polytomies vs. hard polytomies
Two types of polytomies are recognised, soft and hard polytomies. 

Soft polytomies are the result of insufficient phylogenetic information: though the lineages diverged at different times – meaning that some of these lineages are closer relatives than others, and the available data does not allow recognition of this. Most polytomies are soft, meaning that they would be resolved into a typical tree of dichotomies if better data were available.

In contrast, a hard polytomy represents a true divergence event of three or more lineages.

Applications 
Interpretations for a polytomy depend on the individuals, that are represented in the phylogenetic tree.

Species polytomies 
If the lineages in the phylogenetic tree stand for species, a polytomy shows the simultaneous speciation of three or more species. In particular situations they may be common, for example when a species that has rapidly expanded its range or is highly panmictic undergoes peripatric speciation in different regions. 

An example is the Drosophila simulans species complex. Here, the ancestor seems to have colonized two islands at the same time but independently, yielding two equally old but divergently evolved daughter species

Molecular polytomies 
If a phylogenetic tree is reconstructed from DNA sequence data of a particular gene, a hard polytomy arises when three or more sampled genes trace their ancestry to a single gene in an ancestral organism. In contrast, a soft polytomy stems from branches on gene trees of finite temporal duration but for which no substitutions have occurred.

Recognizing hard polytomies

As DNA sequence evolution is usually much faster than evolution of complex phenotypic traits, it may be that genetic lineages diverge a short time apart from each other, while the actual organism has not changed if the whole ancestral population is considered. Since few if any individuals in a population are genetically alike in any one population – especially if lineage sorting has not widely progressed – it may be that hard polytomies are indeed rare or nonexistent if the entire genome of each individual organism is considered, but rather widespread on the population genetical level if entire species are considered as interbreeding populations (see also species concept).

"Speciation or lineage divergence events occurring at the same time" refers to evolutionary time measured in generations, as this is the only means that novel traits (e.g. germline point mutations) can be passed on. In practical terms, the ability to distinguish between hard and soft polytomies is limited: if for example a kilobase of DNA sequences which mutate approximately 1% per million years is analysed, lineages diverging from the same ancestor within the same 100,000 years cannot be reliably distinguished as to which one diverged first.

Founder effects and genetic drift may result in different rates of evolution. This can easily confound molecular clock algorithms to the point where hard polytomies become unrecognizable as such.

See also
 Cladistics
 Computational phylogenetics
 Phylogenetic comparative methods
 Phylogenetics
 Systematics

References

External links
http://biology.fullerton.edu/biol404/phylo/polytomies.html

Phylogenetics